"Singing in Viet Nam Talking Blues" (or "Singin' in Viet Nam Talkin' Blues") is a song written and originally recorded by Johnny Cash.

Released in May 1971 as the second single (Columbia 4-45393, with "You've Got a New Light Shining" on the opposite side) from Cash's that year's album Man in Black, the song reached #18 on U.S. Billboard country chart and #124 on Billboard's Bubbling Under the Hot 100.

Analysis

Track listing

Charts

References

External links 
 "Singing in Viet Nam Talking Blues" on the Johnny Cash official website

Johnny Cash songs
1971 songs
1971 singles
Columbia Records singles
Songs written by Johnny Cash